The Krishnai River is a sub-tributary of the Brahmaputra River in the Indian state of Assam. The Krishnai river originates in the West Garo Hills of Meghalaya. The Krishnai River meets Dudhnoi River at Matia of Goalpara district and then flows as Mornoi River before its confluence with the Brahmaputra river.

References 

Rivers of Assam
Rivers of India